The 2015 Abha mosque bombing occurred on 6 August 2015, when a suicide bomb attack killed 17 people at a mosque in the south-western Saudi Arabian city of Abha.

Responsibility for the attack, in a city near Saudi Arabia's southern border with Yemen, a country presently torn apart by the Yemeni Civil War, was claimed by a self-described affiliate of Islamic State of Iraq and Syria calling itself Hijaz Province of the Islamic State.

See also

 Qatif and Dammam mosque bombings
 2015 Arar attack
 Kuwait mosque bombing
 Terrorism in Saudi Arabia
 List of terrorist incidents, 2015

References

Mosque bombings by Islamists
Terrorist incidents in Saudi Arabia in 2015
Mass murder in 2015
Suicide bombings in Saudi Arabia
ISIL terrorist incidents in Saudi Arabia
2015 murders in Saudi Arabia